Diana Rowland is an urban fantasy writer and is best known for her Kara Gillian Series and White Trash Zombie Series. She has worked as a bartender, a blackjack dealer, a pit boss, a street cop, a detective, a computer forensics specialist, a crime scene investigator, and a morgue assistant. She presently lives in south Louisiana with her husband and her daughter.

Diana Rowland is a graduate of the 1998 Clarion West Writers Workshop. In 2005, Rowland won first place in the third quarter of the Writers of the Future contest for her short story "Schroedinger's Hummingbird." This was her first time entering the contest. In 2011 Rowland was nominated for an RT Reviewer's Choice award for Best Urban Fantasy Protagonist for her character Angel Crawford from My Life as a White Trash Zombie. In 2012 Rowland was again nominated for Best Urban Fantasy Protagonist for Angel Crawford, this time for Even White Trash Zombies Get the Blues, and won. In 2013 Rowland received an RT Reviewer's Choice nomination for Best Urban Fantasy Worldbuilding for Touch of the Demon.

In 2012 the audiobook of My Life as a White Trash Zombie, narrated by Allison McLemore, was nominated for an Audie award.

Bibliography

Kara Gillian series
A series that starts with Kara Gillian accidentally summoning a demon prince while her aunt lies in a coma at the hospital.
Mark of the Demon  
Blood of the Demon  
Secrets of the Demon  
Sins of the Demon  
Touch of the Demon  
Fury of the Demon 
Vengeance of the Demon 
Legacy of the Demon

White Trash Zombie series
My Life As a White Trash Zombie (2011)  
Even White Trash Zombies Get the Blues (2012) 
White Trash Zombie Apocalypse (2013) 
How the White Trash Zombie Got Her Groove Back (2014) 
White Trash Zombie Gone Wild (Release date: October, 6th 2015) 
White Trash Zombie Unchained (Release date: September 5, 2017)

Short fiction
"Extant"-- The Age of Reason: Stories for a new Millenium, edited by Kurt Roth 1999 (Honorable Mention in the 17th Annual Year's Best Science Fiction)
"Schroedinger's Hummingbird" -- L. Ron Hubbard presents Writers of the Future Vol. XXII 2006
"Fine Print" -- The Wild Side, edited by Mark Van Name. 2011
"City Lazarus" -- Dangerous Women, edited by George R.R. Martin and Gardner Dozois, 2013

Interviews
"SDCC 2011 Video interview: Diana Rowland" at suvudu.com
"Fangs for the Fantasy interview with Diana Rowland"

References

External links
 Official website

Living people
21st-century American novelists
American fantasy writers
American women novelists
Dark fantasy writers
Women science fiction and fantasy writers
21st-century American women writers
Year of birth missing (living people)
Urban fantasy writers